Philo Belden (October 22, 1815September 9, 1889) was a Wisconsin pioneer who helped establish the village of Rochester, Wisconsin, and was a member of the Wisconsin State Assembly and the Wisconsin State Senate.

Early life
Belden was born in Canaan, Connecticut, the sixth child of Jonathan and Love Dean Belden.  He left Connecticut in 1835 and purchased land in the Michigan Territory.  However, in 1836 he traveled to Racine County, in the Wisconsin Territory, and subsequently decided to sell his land in Michigan and purchased land in Rochester, in western Racine County, in 1838.

Early years in Wisconsin

In October 1839, Belden, along with fellow Racine County pioneers Martin C. Whitman, Levi Godfrey, Obed Hurlbut, and Hiland Hurlbut, plotted all of the village property of Rochester west of the Fox River, and the portion on the east side of the river south of Main Street.

Belden made many investments in the development of Rochester, including a saw mill built in 1840, and a water power-producing dam on the Fox River, built in 1842.  Also in 1842, he established the first flour mill in Rochester, which he operated as the sole proprietor until 1846.  He also operated an iron factory, which made casings for his mills.  And he constructed the first brick chimney in Rochester, bringing bricks from the mouth of Root River.

In 1855, Belden organized the Fox River Valley Railroad company, which attempted to construct a railroad from Richmond, Illinois, to Milwaukee, Wisconsin, traveling through Burlington, Rochester, and Waterford, in Racine County.  He won many wealthy investors in Milwaukee and reorganized the company into the Milwaukee and Northern Illinois Railroad, with Belden remaining as President.  The company had nearly completed grading of the route but was never able to lay the rail lines. Belden lost a considerable amount of his personal wealth in the failure of the company.

Political career
Belden received his first office in 1839, when he was appointed a justice of the peace for Racine County by Wisconsin Territory governor Henry Dodge.  He was re-appointed to the position in 1842 by Dodge's successor, James Duane Doty.  He was elected to the Rochester Town Board, served five terms on the Racine County Board, and was Chairman of the County Board in 1854.

He was elected to the Wisconsin Assembly in 1852 as a member of the Whig Party, advocating against slavery and in favor of temperance.

He returned to the Assembly in 1864 and 1866 as a member of the National Union Party, and in 1870 he was elected to represent Racine County in the Wisconsin Senate as a Republican.

In 1882, Belden was appointed to fill a vacant Racine County Judge seat by Governor Jeremiah Rusk.  He was elected to a full term as Judge later that year.  He resigned the seat in 1889 just a week before his death.  His grandson, Ellsworth Burnett Belden, was appointed to finish his judicial term, and was later elected to serve on the Wisconsin Circuit Court.

Philo Belden died on September 9, 1889, in Rochester.  His funeral was held on September 11, 1889, at St. Luke's Episcopal Church in Racine, and he was buried at Rochester Cemetery.

Family life

On June 6, 1839, he married Mary Francis Belden of La Porte, Indiana, the daughter of Henry and Fannie Belden.  They had four sons, the eldest three served in the Union Army during the American Civil War.

 Henry Ward Belden volunteered in the 24th Wisconsin Infantry Regiment and eventually became a captain in the 37th Wisconsin Infantry Regiment.  He married Emily Brown of Rochester, moved to Milwaukee and eventually settled in Tennessee.  They had five children, Judge Ellsworth Burnett Belden, Louis Jay Belden, Ruby L. Belden, Robert Brown Belden, and Charles Ezra Belden.

 Edward D. J. Belden joined the 1st Wisconsin Heavy Artillery Regiment and was stationed in Washington, D.C.  He married "Nellie" and moved to Oregon and then California after the Civil War.

 Albert O. Belden, who was only 15, enlisted at President Lincoln's call for sixty day troops and served as a Private in the 39th Wisconsin Infantry Regiment.  He married Janet Ormiston of Union Grove, Wisconsin, and remained in Rochester. They had a son, Philo Warren Belden.

 Allen H. Belden married Ella Robertson, divorced, and remarried Etta Burns and also remained in Rochester.  He had one son with Ella Robertson, Louis Andrew Belden.

References

External links

1815 births
1889 deaths
Members of the Wisconsin State Assembly
People from Canaan, Connecticut
People from Rochester, Wisconsin
Wisconsin state senators
Wisconsin state court judges
19th-century American politicians
19th-century American judges
Wisconsin Whigs
Wisconsin Republicans